Wyoming Highway 236 (WYO 236) is a  state road in Lincoln County, Wyoming that acts as a spur to Fairview, located southwest of Afton.

Route description
Wyoming Highway 236 acts as a spur from US 89 south of Afton and from there travels west to an intersection with County Route 140 (Bitter Creek Rd.) & County Route 142 (Fairview North Road) in Fairview where the WYO 236 designation ends. The roadway itself continues west as CR 142 to Crow Creek Road (CR 141) as a county-maintained route.

Major intersections

References

Official 2003 State Highway Map of Wyoming

External links 

Wyoming State Routes
WYO 236 - Fairview to WYO 241
WYO 236 WYO 241 to US 89

Transportation in Lincoln County, Wyoming
236